The Story of Caesar and Cleopatra is an amalgamation of fourteen tapestries put together by the Art Institute of Chicago from three separate tapestry series in their collection. The original tapestry series' were the Story of Caesar Augustus, the Story of Cleopatra, sometimes referred to as the Story of Cleopatra and Antony, and the Story of Zenobia and Aurelian, all designed by Justus van Egmont in the 17th century. The tapestries were made in the Flemish High Baroque style. They were produced by some of the leading weaving workshops of the time and were commercially successful.

Justus van Egmont 
Justus van Egmont designed all the tapestries in the series. He was primarily a painter born in Leiden in 1601. He trained in Antwerp under Gasper van der Hoecke. He then worked under Antony van Dyck, before moving to the workshop of Peter Paul Rubens. While in Ruben's workshop van Egmont assisted with the Life of Marie de Medici.

In 1628 he became a master of the Antwerp Guild of St. Luke. Later that year he moved to Paris where he became a portrait painter for the House of Orleans. In 1648 he helped to found the Académie de peinture et de sculpture.

It was after returning to Antwerp around 1650 that he began to work on his own tapestry designs for the Van Leefdael-Van der Strecken-Peemans association.

Original Tapestry Series 
The Story of Caesar and Cleopatra consists of fourteen tapestry designs taken from three different tapestry series:

The Story of Caesar, designed by van Egmont between 1651 and March 1659. Eight designs have been attributed to this series. Caesar was one of the Nine Worthies; historical figures who embodied the ideals of chivalry. Caesar was also the subject of several popular plays including Shakespeare's Julius Caesar, published in 1623. Given the popularity of the subject, it was not a risk to create a tapestry series based on Caesar's life.

The Story of Cleopatra (also sometimes referred to as the Story of Cleopatra and Antony), designed between 1649 and 1651 after van Egmont's return from France. The series has nine designs linked to it, identified by their inscriptions. They were most likely commissioned by Jan van Leefdael and Gerard van der Streekan, and all the tapestries bear their, or their successors, signatures. Cleopatra was a common tapestry subject as the Life of Antony in Plutarch's Parallel Lives had been translated and popularized in the 16th century.

The Story of Zenobia and Aurelian, designed from 1664 to 1665. There are eight designs linked to this series, commissioned by the workshop of Gerard Peemans. Zenobia was the queen of Palmyra and claimed to be descended from Cleopatra and Mark Antony. She went on a campaign of conquest but was defeated by Aurelian, a Roman emperor. Zenobia was a well liked historical figure in the 17th century, and was the subject of several popular books. Multiple tapestry series telling her story were produced in Brussels and Antwerp.

The Story of Caesar and Cleopatra tapestries 
Many of the tapestries in the original series were repeated compositions, with different captions to designate them as different scenes. The tapestries were commissioned and produced by several of the leading weaving workshops of the time, such as the Van Leefdael-Van der Strecken-Peemans association. The series were commercially successfully, as evidenced by the multiple editions that were produced.

The subject matter of the tapestries demonstrates the interest in female historical figures during the 17th century. The tapestries were designed in the Flemish High Baroque style. They display signature characteristics of the style such as expressive facial expressions, monumental figures, and dramatic poses. Some of the borders on the tapestries are also identical to the borders in Peter Paul Ruben's tapestry series The Story of Constantine.

References 

Flemish art
Tapestries
Cultural depictions of Julius Caesar
Cultural depictions of Cleopatra
Cultural depictions of Pompey
Cultural depictions of Publius Clodius Pulcher